James Patterson Linn (February 24, 1870 – June 9, 1949) was an American football coach.  He served and the head football coach at the  Western University of Pennsylvania—now known as the University of Pittsburgh—in 1895, compiling a record of 1–6.

Linn was born in Shippensburg, Pennsylvania in 1870. He died in Redwood Falls, Minnesota in 1949 and was buried in Redwood Falls Cemetery.

Head coaching record

References

External links
 

1870 births
1949 deaths
19th-century players of American football
American football ends
Pittsburgh Panthers football coaches
Washington & Jefferson Presidents football players
People from Shippensburg, Pennsylvania